Mervyn Reddaway Popham, FBA, FSA (14 July 1927 – 24 October 2000) was a British archaeologist and prehistorian.

Born in Exeter, Popham was educated at the John Stacker School, Exeter and Exeter School. After National Service in the Royal Navy, he proceeded to the University of St Andrews, where he became interested in epigraphy and Cyprus under the archaeologist Terence Mitford.

Joining the Colonial Administrative Service in 1951, Popham served in Cyprus, including during the Cyprus Emergency. Returning to archaeology, he completed a diploma in archaeology at the University of Oxford.

He was elected a Fellow of the British Academy in 1988.

References 

British archaeologists
1927 births
2000 deaths
Place of birth missing
Place of death missing
Alumni of the University of St Andrews
Fellows of the Society of Antiquaries of London
Alumni of the University of Oxford
Fellows of Linacre College, Oxford
Academics of the University of Oxford
University of Cincinnati faculty
20th-century British archaeologists
Classical archaeologists
Colonial Administrative Service officers
British Cyprus people
People educated at Exeter School
Fellows of the British Academy